Sergey Komarov may refer to:
 Sergey Komarov (skier)
 Sergey Komarov (actor)